Raminji or Raminj or Khairabad Raminj is a village in the Chipursan Valley of Gojal, Gilgit-Baltistan, Pakistan

Politics 

Nazir Sabir, the famed Pakistani mountaineer who summitted Everest and K2, was born in Raminji in the Chipursan valley. He began his political career from Shrine of Baba Ghundi and was elected to the Gilgit Baltistan Legislative Assembly. He remembers his parents had fed him quite a bit of mud from Baba Ghundi hence his successes in life in some ways.

References

Populated places in Hunza District